Riker Hylton (born 13 December 1988) is a Jamaican sprinter, competing in the 400 metres.

Riker Hylton won a bronze medal as part of the Jamaican team in the 4 × 400 metres relay at the 2011 World Championships in Athletics in Daegu. He also ran in the 400 metres, where he was eliminated in the semi-finals

Hylton did not make the individual 400m Jamaican team for the 2012 Summer Olympics, but did compete in the 4 × 400 metres relay, running the second leg in the heats before Jermaine Gonzales pulled up injured.

In 2017, he was charged with evading a doping test by the Jamaica Anti-Doping Commission ("JADCO"). He was cleared of any wrongdoing by Jamaica's Independent Anti-Doping Disciplinary Panel. The Panel was not "comfortably satisfied" that Hylton had been properly notified by JADCO. Hylton was represented by noted sports attorney Dr. Emir Crowne.

References

External links

1988 births
Living people
People from Saint Catherine Parish
Jamaican male sprinters
Athletes (track and field) at the 2012 Summer Olympics
Olympic athletes of Jamaica
World Athletics Championships medalists
Athletes (track and field) at the 2015 Pan American Games
Pan American Games competitors for Jamaica
Essex County College alumni
LSU Tigers track and field athletes
20th-century Jamaican people
21st-century Jamaican people